The Jiugong Tunnel or Siwei Tunnel is a tunnel in Lieyu Township, Kinmen County, Taiwan. It was used during the 1958 Second Taiwan Strait Crisis, when the island was heavily shelled by People's Republic of China. Supplies and equipment from larger ocean going ships were brought in to shore by smaller vessels. They were unloaded in the tunnel safe from the bombardments.

Geology
The tunnel is located on a coastal area at the southeast of Lieyu Island. It is located in a reef of granite mountain.

Architecture
The tunnel was constructed in a twin T-shape with four exits. It spans over a length of 790 meters and a height of 11.5 meters.

See also
 List of tourist attractions in Taiwan

References

Lieyu Township
Military history of Taiwan
Tunnels in Kinmen County
Tunnel warfare